Dennis L. Via (born ) is a retired United States Army four-star general who last served as the 18th commanding general of the United States Army Materiel Command from August 7, 2012 to September 30, 2016. He is the first Signal Corps officer since General Henry H. Arnold to achieve four-star rank. He retired from the army on September 30, 2016 after over 36 years of service.

Military career
A native of Martinsville, Virginia, Via was commissioned on May 18, 1980, in the Signal Corps after graduating as a Distinguished Military Graduate from Virginia State University. He holds a master's degree from Boston University, and is a graduate of the United States Army Command and General Staff College (class of 1991) and the United States Army War College (class of 1999).

Via began his career with the 35th Signal Brigade, XVIII Airborne Corps, Fort Bragg.

Via's prior assignment was as AMC's Deputy Commanding General. He deployed to Southwest Asia in October 2011 as the Commander, AMC Responsible Reset Task Force with the mission of leading the strategic integration of the Materiel Enterprise for the Retrograde of equipment and materiel out of Iraq at the conclusion of Operation New Dawn. Prior to that, he served as Director for Command, Control, Communications and Computer Systems, J-6, The Joint Staff, Washington, D.C.

Via's command assignments include the 82nd Signal Battalion, 82nd Airborne Division, Fort Bragg, N.C.; 3rd Signal Brigade, III Armored Corps, Fort Hood, Texas; 5th Signal Command, United States Army Europe and 7th Army, Mannheim, Germany; and the United States Army Communications-Electronics Life Cycle Management Command and Fort Monmouth, Fort Monmouth, N.J. His key staff assignments include Aide-de-Camp to the Chief of Staff, Allied Forces Southern Europe, Naples, Italy; Operations Officer, J-6, Armed Forces Inaugural Committee, Washington, DC; Division Chief, Joint Requirements Oversight Council (JROC), Office of the Deputy Chief of Staff, G-8, United States Army, Washington, DC; Principal Director for Operations, Defense Information Systems Agency/Deputy Commander, Joint Task Force-Global Network Operations, United States Strategic Command, Arlington, Va.

Awards and decorations

References

United States Army generals
Recipients of the Defense Distinguished Service Medal
Recipients of the Distinguished Service Medal (US Army)
Recipients of the Defense Superior Service Medal
Boston University alumni
Recipients of the Legion of Merit
Virginia State University alumni
United States Army Command and General Staff College alumni
United States Army War College alumni
People from Martinsville, Virginia
Year of birth uncertain
African-American United States Army personnel